The Tour de Mayen (2,326 m) is a mountain of the Swiss Prealps, located north of Leysin in the canton of Vaud. It lies east of the Tour d'Aï, on the range lying between the lake of Hongrins and the valley of Ormont Dessous and Ormont Dessus.

References

External links

 Tour de Mayen on Hikr

Mountains of Switzerland
Mountains of the Alps
Mountains of the canton of Vaud